Golf Manor is a village in Hamilton County, Ohio, United States. It is almost completely surrounded by the Pleasant Ridge and Roselawn neighborhoods of Cincinnati. The population was 3,581 at the 2020 census.

History
Golf Manor was laid out by property developers in the 1920s. The community was named for the fact there were three golf courses near the town site.

Geography
Golf Manor is located at  (39.187109, -84.446365).

Demographics

2010 census
As of the census of 2010, there were 3,611 people, 1,614 households, and 897 families living in the village. The racial makeup of the village was 24.3% White, 72.6% African American, 0.1% Native American, 0.2% Asian, 0.4% from other races, and 2.3% from two or more races. Hispanic or Latino of any race were 1.2% of the population.

There were 1,614 households, of which 30.4% had children under the age of 18 living with them, 25.6% were married couples living together, 25.9% had a female householder with no husband present, 4.1% had a male householder with no wife present, and 44.4% were non-families. 39.3% of all households were made up of individuals, and 12.6% had someone living alone who was 65 years of age or older. The average household size was 2.24 and the average family size was 3.01.

The median age in the village was 38.1 years. 26.1% of residents were under the age of 18; 7.6% were between the ages of 18 and 24; 25.4% were from 25 to 44; 28.1% were from 45 to 64; and 12.7% were 65 years of age or older. The gender makeup of the village was 44.6% male and 55.4% female.

2000 census
As of the census of 2000, there were 3,999 people, 1,751 households, and 1,055 families living in the village. The population density was 6,896.3 people per square mile (2,662.1/km2). There were 1,840 housing units at an average density of 3,173.1 per square mile (1,224.9/km2). The racial makeup of the village was 34.23% White, 62.89% African American, 0.05% Native American, 0.70% Asian, 0.38% from other races, and 1.75% from two or more races. Hispanic or Latino of any race were 0.60% of the population.

There were 1,751 households, out of which 29.4% had children under the age of 18 living with them, 34.6% were married couples living together, 21.2% had a female householder with no husband present, and 39.7% were non-families. 34.7% of all households were made up of individuals, and 11.5% had someone living alone who was 65 years of age or older. The average household size was 2.28 and the average family size was 2.95.

In the village, the population was spread out, with 25.6% under the age of 18, 6.9% from 18 to 24, 29.8% from 25 to 44, 23.3% from 45 to 64, and 14.4% who were 65 years of age or older. The median age was 38 years. For every 100 females there were 81.5 males. For every 100 females age 18 and over, there were 75.4 males.

The median income for a household in the village was $37,111, and the median income for a family was $47,328. Males had a median income of $34,444 versus $29,116 for females. The per capita income for the village was $19,044. About 9.2% of families and 10.7% of the population were below the poverty line, including 13.0% of those under age 18 and 14.5% of those age 65 or over.

Religion
The village is home to the oldest Orthodox Jewish synagogue in the Cincinnati area, Golf Manor Synagogue.

References

External links
 Village website

Villages in Hamilton County, Ohio
Villages in Ohio
1920s establishments in Ohio